Devdas  is a Bangladeshi Bengali romantic film based on the Sharat Chandra Chattopadhyay novel Devdas. It is the second Bangladeshi and fifth Bengali version of the story. It was directed by Chashi Nazrul Islam, who also directed the 1982 version, and stars Shakib Khan as Devdas, alongside Moushumi and Apu Biswas in the leading roles.

It was released on 15 February 2013 to positive response from critics, and a good opening at the box office.

Plot
Devdas is a young man from a wealthy Bengali Brahmin family in Bangladesh in the early 1900s. Paro (Parvati) is a young woman from a middle class Bengali family belonging to the merchant caste. The two families lived in a village in Bengal, and Devdas and Paro were childhood friends. Devdas goes away for thirteen years to live and study in a boarding school in the city of Calcutta (now Kolkata). When, after finishing school, he returns to his village, Paro looks forward to their childhood love blossoming into their lifelong journey together in marriage. Of course, according to the prevailing social custom, Paro's parents would have to approach Devdas' parents and propose marriage of Paro to Devdas as Paro longed for. When Paro's mother makes the proposal to Devdas' mother, the latter insults her, plainly saying that the marriage is not possible in view of her own higher caste and financial status. To demonstrate her own social status, Paro's mother then finds an even richer husband for Paro. When Paro learns of her planned marriage, she stealthily meets Devdas at night, desperately believing that Devdas will quickly accept her hand in marriage. Devdas meekly seeks his parents' permission to marry Paro, but Devdas' father agrees with his wife. In a weak-minded state, Devdas then flees to Calcutta, and from there, he writes a letter to Paro, saying that they were only friends. Within days, however, he realizes that he should have been bolder. He goes back to his village and tells Paro that he is ready to do anything needed to save their love. By now, Paro's marriage plans are in an advanced stage, and she declines going back to Devdas and chides him for his cowardice and vacillation. She makes, however, one request to Devdas that he would return to her before he dies. Devdas vows to do so. Devdas goes back to Calcutta and Paro is married off to the betrothed widower with children, who is still in love with his previous wife and is therefore not interested in an amatory relationship with Paro. In Calcutta, Devdas' carousing friend, Chunnilal, introduces him to a courtesan named Chandramukhi. Devdas takes to heavy drinking at Chandramukhi's place, but the courtesan falls in love with him, and looks after him. His health deteriorates because of a combination of excessive drinking and despair of life a drawn-out form of suicide. Within him, he frequently compares Paro and Chandramukhi, remaining ambivalent as to whom he really loves. Sensing his fast-approaching death, Devdas returns to meet Paro to fulfill his vow. He dies at her doorstep on a dark, cold night. On hearing of the death of Devdas, Paro runs towards the door, but her family members prevent her from stepping out of the door.

Cast
 Shakib Khan - Devdas
 Moushumi - Chandramukhi
 Apu Biswas - Parvati
 Shahiduzzaman Selim - Chunnilal ("Chunnibabu")
 Shirin Bokul - Parvati's Mother
 Lina Ahmed - Devdas's Mother
 Ahmed Sharif - Devdas's Father

Soundtrack
The soundtrack of the film composed by Emon Saha with lyrics penned by Gazi Mazharul Anwar and Mohammad Rafiquzzaman.

Production
The movie was expected to be released in 2011, but due to Film Censor Board problems, it failed to do so. In December 2012, it got clearance from Bangladesh Film Censor Board after cutting some scenes about which the board showed concern considering public sentiment. Scenes portraying Chunilal character wearing 'coatee', usually worn on Punjabi or kurta in the Indian subcontinent, "looked like a Mujib coat" (a kind of black waist coat used by the country's founding president Sheikh Mujibur Rahman) to some members of the censor board and asked to cut those.

References

Further reading

External links
 

2013 films
2013 romantic drama films
Bengali-language Bangladeshi films
Bangladeshi romantic drama films
Devdas films
Films scored by Emon Saha
2010s Bengali-language films
Impress Telefilm films